Hirschfeld Wildlife Park is in Voigtsgrün, part of the municipality of Hirschfeld, near Zwickau in the German Free State of Saxony.

Records by Lady Martha von Arnim (née von Schlegell) prove that the site and its stand of trees have been protected for centuries.

Maps from 1870 show that there was already a wildlife enclosure at this site. It belonged to Lord Alexander von Arnim, who kept deer here. In 1890, a hunting lodge was built in the enclosure that still exists today and is referred to as the "log cabin" (Blockhaus). In 1909, his brother, Arno von Arnim, inherited Voigtsgrün and thus the animal enclosure too.

In 1956, the enclosure, which covered an area of about 6 hectares, was turned into a wildlife park. The first livestock included red deer, red fox and badger.

Today, the area of the park has been enlarged and contains about 600 animals of 90 species. These include raccoon dogs, wild boar, bears, gray wolves, pot-bellied pigs, waders, Heidschnucken, raccoons, porcupines, mouflon, bison, snowy owls,  monkeys and ferrets. The area also includes trees up to 450 years old.

In addition to the animal enclosures, the park also has a petting zoo, restaurants, a minigolf course and a children's playground. Visitors are allowed to bring their dogs to the park.

External links 
 Hirschfeld Wildlife Park

Zoos in Germany
Ore Mountains
Culture of Saxony